The 2023 U Sports University Cup was held March 16–19, 2023, in Charlottetown, Prince Edward Island, to determine a national champion for the 2022–23 U Sports men's ice hockey season. The third-seeded UNB Reds defeated the fifth-seeded Alberta Golden Bears by a score of 3–0 to win the program's ninth national championship.

Host
The tournament was played at the Eastlink Centre and was hosted by the University of Prince Edward Island. UPEI was originally scheduled to host the 2021 U Sports University Cup, but that tournament was cancelled due to the COVID-19 pandemic in Canada. This was the second time that UPEI hosted the tournament, having first hosted in the school's inaugural year in 1970.

Participating teams

Championship bracket

References

External links
 Tournament Web Site

U Sports men's ice hockey
Ice hockey competitions in Prince Edward Island
University Cup, 2023
Sports competitions in Charlottetown
2023 in Prince Edward Island